Domodossola, also spelled as I Domodossola, was an Italian pop band, active between 1969 and 1977.

Career
The group consisted of the siblings Laura (born 1948), Maura (b. 1950) and Urbano Miserocchi (b. 1952), their cousin Riccardo Miserocchi (b. 1949), their uncle Franco Bertagnini (b. 1941), Renzo Reami (b. 1945) and Pierluigi Saccani (b. 1948).

During their career Domodossola took part in the 1971 edition of Un disco per l'estate, and in 1970 and in 1974 they entered the main competition at the Sanremo Music Festival with the songs "Ciao anni verdi" and "Se hai paura". Their last hit was the 1977 song "Dolce così", which ranked #36 on the Italian hit parade; the group disbanded shortly later.

Discography
Album
 
     1971: D... come Domodossola (PDU, PLD A 5036)
     1972: L'allegria (PDU, PLD A 5063)
     1974: Se hai paura (PDU, PLD A 5086)

References

External links

Italian pop music groups
Living people
Musical groups established in 1969
Musical groups disestablished in 1977
Year of birth missing (living people)